Northangera is a locality in the Queanbeyan-Palerang Region, Southern Tablelands, New South Wales, Australia. The name Northangera was assigned on 13 July 2001. It lies on the  Kings Highway about 100 km east of Canberra and 15 km east of Braidwood.

The area now known as Northangera lies on the traditional lands of the Walbanga people, a group of the Yuin. 

It had a "half-time" School from 1921 to 1931.

References 

Queanbeyan–Palerang Regional Council
Localities in New South Wales
Southern Tablelands